The 2010 Men's European Water Polo Championship was the 29th edition of the bi-annual event, organised by the Europe's governing body in aquatics, the Ligue Européenne de Natation. The event took place from 29 August – 11 September at the Sports park Mladost in Zagreb, Croatia.

The decision about host country was brought on the LEN's meeting in Eindhoven in late March 2008.

Qualification

12 teams were allowed to the tournament. The qualification was as follows:
 The host nation
 The best 5 teams from the 2008 European Championships not already qualified as the host nation
 6 teams from the Qualifiers

Groups

Preliminary round

Group A 

First round

Second round

Third round

Fourth round

Fifth round

Group B 

First round

Second round

Third round

Fourth round

Fifth round

7th–12th Classification

Bracket

7th–12th Quarterfinals

7th–10th Semifinals

11th  place playoff

9th place playoff

7th place playoff

Final round

Bracket

Quarterfinals

Semifinals

5th place match

3rd place match

Final

Final ranking

Awards

References

External links 

 

Men
Men's European Water Polo Championship
International water polo competitions hosted by Croatia
E
W
Sports competitions in Zagreb
2010s in Zagreb
August 2010 sports events in Europe
September 2010 sports events in Europe